Paul Wallich (1882–1938) was a German banker and son of the banker Hermann Wallich, one of the founders of Deutsche Bank. An assimilated Jew, who considered himself Christian, he rose to become a partner in the bank Dreyfus & Co. Wallich was also a scholar and a book collector, with a collection of 30,000 volumes.

When the Nazis rose to power, Wallich and his bank were persecuted due to Jewish heritage. The bank was Aryanized, that is transferred to a non-Jewish owner, Merck Finck & Co., a Munich-based bank. He signed a 10-year consulting contract for 50,000 marks per year.

Wallich committed suicide in the aftermath of the Kristallnacht pogrom by drowning himself in the Rhine at Cologne.

Notes

1882 births
1938 deaths
German bankers
19th-century German Jews
1938 suicides
Suicides by drowning in Germany
German Jews who died in the Holocaust
Suicides by Jews during the Holocaust